North Riding County Council (NRCC) was the county council of the administrative county of the North Riding of Yorkshire. It came into its powers on 1 April 1889 and was abolished on 31 March 1974. The council met at County Hall in Northallerton. It was largely replaced by North Yorkshire County Council with some responsibilities being transferred to the following district authorities: Selby, Harrogate, Craven, Richmondshire, Hambleton, Ryedale and Scarborough.

References

Former county councils of England
1889 establishments in England
1974 disestablishments in England
North Riding of Yorkshire